The Carolina Panthers are a professional American football club based in Charlotte, North Carolina. They play in the southern division of the National Football Conference (NFC), one of the two conferences of the National Football League (NFL). Since the team began play in 1995, there have been five head coaches. In the NFL, head coaches are responsible for managing the team and setting the game plan; play-calling duties are either made by the head coach or delegated by him to an assistant coach.

The team's first head coach, Dom Capers, led the team for its first four seasons, recording a regular-season record of 30–34 (.469 winning percentage). in 1996. Capers was named coach of the year by Pro Football Weekly/PFWA in 1995 and 1996; he was also awarded coach of the year by several other organizations in 1996, including the Associated Press, the Maxwell Football Club, Sporting News, and United Press International. After Capers' dismissal following the 1998 season, the team brought in George Seifert as their second head coach. Over Seifert's three seasons the team never made the playoffs and the team had a regular-season record of 16–32 (.333 winning percentage). John Fox, the team's third coach, was the longest-tenured coach in team history. In his nine seasons as head coach the Panthers recorded a regular-season record of 73–71 (.507), the most wins for a head coach in team history, and a playoff record of 5–3. The team's fourth head coach, Ron Rivera, served nine seasons as head coach and had a record of 76–63–1 (.546) during his tenure, with a 3–4 record in the playoffs. Rivera has the highest winning percentage of any coach in team history. Rivera led the team to a record four playoff appearances, including three straight division titles.

Of the five Panthers head coaches, Seifert and Matt Rhule have not led the team to the playoffs. Capers led the team to a playoff appearance in the 1996 season, winning once at home before losing in the NFC Championship Game to the Green Bay Packers. Fox led the team to three playoff appearances (2003, 2005, and 2008), winning the NFC Championship in 2003 before losing in Super Bowl XXXVIII to the New England Patriots and making the NFC Championship game in 2005 before losing to the Seattle Seahawks. Rivera led the team to three straight playoff appearances from 2013 to 2015, culminating in a loss in Super Bowl 50. He returned the team to the playoffs in 2017, losing in the Wild Card round.

Key

Coaches
Note: Statistics are accurate through end of the 2021 NFL season.

Notes

References

External links
 Carolina Panthers at NFL.com

 
Car
Head coaches